Bennie Boatwright Jr. (born July 13, 1996) is an American professional basketball player for the Fort Wayne Mad Ants of the NBA G League. He played college basketball for the USC Trojans.

Early life and high school career
Boatwright is the son of police officer Bennie Boatwright Sr., who was an All-CIF shooting guard at Lutheran High. Boatwright attended Village Christian School, where he was coached by Jon Shaw. As a senior, he averaged 27 points and 12 rebounds per game. Boatwright led the team to a Southern Section 1AA championship, scoring 30 points and grabbing 13 rebounds in the title game. He signed with USC.

College career
Boatwright averaged 11.5 points and 5.2 rebounds per game and made 60 3-pointers as a freshman. As a sophomore, he averaged a team-high 15.1 points and helped the Trojans to two wins in the NCAA tournament. He declared for the NBA draft but ultimately returned to school. His junior season was shortened as he missed the final nine games. He averaged 13.6 points and 6.4 rebounds per game as a junior. In the offseason after his junior year, Boatwright underwent knee surgery. As a senior, Boatwright averaged 18.2 points, 6.6 rebounds and 2.5 assists per game. He was named to the First Team All-Pac-12.

Professional career

Memphis Hustle (2019–2021)
After going undrafted in the 2019 NBA draft, Boatwright joined the Detroit Pistons' Summer League roster.

On October 18, 2019, Boatwright signed with the Memphis Grizzlies, but was waived on October 19. He was named to the roster of the Grizzlies’ NBA G League affiliate, the Memphis Hustle. Boatwright missed his rookie season due to a knee injury. On December 15, 2020, Boatwright signed with the Memphis Grizzlies. He was subsequently waived on December 19, and rejoined the Hustle.

Fort Wayne Mad Ants (2021–2022)
On September 10, 2021, the Fort Wayne Mad Ants acquired the returning player rights of Boatwright from the Memphis Hustle. However, he was waived on February 19, 2022, after suffering a season-ending injury.

Indiana Pacers (2022)
On September 16, 2022, Boatwright signed with the Indiana Pacers. He was then later waived.

Return to Fort Wayne (2022–present)
On September 26, 2022, Boatwright signed with the Fort Wayne Mad Ants.

Career statistics

College

|-
| style="text-align:left;"| 2015–16
| style="text-align:left;"| USC
| 33 || 32 || 24.4 || .394 || .359 || .738 || 5.2 || 1.0 || .4 || .8 || 11.5
|-
| style="text-align:left;"| 2016–17
| style="text-align:left;"| USC
| 19 || 18 || 27.6 || .428 || .364 || .907 || 4.5 || 1.7 || .4 || .4 || 15.1
|-
| style="text-align:left;"| 2017–18
| style="text-align:left;"| USC
| 23 || 18 || 27.7 || .415 || .346 || .726 || 6.4 || 2.0 || .3 || .8 || 13.6
|-
| style="text-align:left;"| 2018–19
| style="text-align:left;"| USC
| 31 || 28 || 33.5 || .474 || .429 || .702 || 6.6 || 2.5 || .7 || .6 || 18.2
|- class="sortbottom"
| style="text-align:center;" colspan="2"| Career
| 106 || 96 || 28.3 || .432 || .380 || .759 || 5.7 || 1.8 || .5 || .7 || 14.5

References

External links
USC Trojans bio

1996 births
Living people
American men's basketball players
Basketball players from Los Angeles
Fort Wayne Mad Ants players
Memphis Hustle players
Power forwards (basketball)
USC Trojans men's basketball players